William Ronald Wood (11 November 1925 – 2012) was an English professional footballer who played as an inside forward. He made appearances in the English Football League for Wrexham.

References

1925 births
2012 deaths
English footballers
Association football forwards
Droylsden F.C. players
Wrexham A.F.C. players
English Football League players